Albert Dalmau Martínez (born 16 March 1992) is a Spanish professional footballer who plays for CF Peralada as a right-back.

Club career
Born in Sils, Girona, Catalonia, Dalmau started playing football for his hometown club, moving to FC Barcelona's youth system La Masia at the age of 13. Still a junior, on 18 April 2010, he made his senior debut with the reserves in the Segunda División B, starting against UE Lleida in a 2–0 home win; they returned to Segunda División after an 11-year absence.

In the following seasons, Dalmau alternated between the second and third tiers, representing Valencia CF Mestalla, Cádiz CF, CD Lugo, Córdoba CF and Hércules CF. In October 2017, he signed with Levante UD to bolster the B side following Iván López's severe knee injury, but was released shortly after in order to move to Romanian team Sepsi OSK Sfântu Gheorghe.

On 3 August 2018, Dalmau agreed to a two-year contract at Lleida Esportiu.

Career statistics

Club

Honours
Spain U17
FIFA U-17 World Cup third place: 2009

References

External links
FC Barcelona profile

1992 births
Living people
People from Selva
Sportspeople from the Province of Girona
Spanish footballers
Footballers from Catalonia
Association football defenders
Segunda División players
Segunda División B players
Tercera División players
Tercera Federación players
FC Barcelona Atlètic players
Valencia CF Mestalla footballers
Cádiz CF players
CD Lugo players
Córdoba CF players
Hércules CF players
Atlético Levante UD players
Lleida Esportiu footballers
UE Costa Brava players
UA Horta players
CF Peralada players
Liga I players
Sepsi OSK Sfântu Gheorghe players
Spain youth international footballers
Spanish expatriate footballers
Expatriate footballers in Romania
Spanish expatriate sportspeople in Romania